Past Lives is an EP by Babyland, released on March 29, 2004 by Mattress Recordings.

Track listing

Personnel
Adapted from the Past Lives liner notes.

Babyland
 Dan Gatto – lead vocals, keyboards
 Michael Smith – percussion

Production and design
 Shawn Porter – recording

Release history

References

External links 
 
 Past Lives at Bandcamp

2004 EPs
Babyland albums
Dependent Records EPs